Francis Ntumba Danga (born 27 July 1963) is a Congolese former professional footballer who played as a defender. He was a squad member of the DR Congo national team at the 1994 and 1996 Africa Cup of Nations.

References

1963 births
Living people
Association football defenders
Democratic Republic of the Congo footballers
Democratic Republic of the Congo international footballers
1994 African Cup of Nations players
1996 African Cup of Nations players
Belgian Pro League players
K.F.C. Lommel S.K. players
Stade Brestois 29 players
Democratic Republic of the Congo expatriate footballers
Expatriate footballers in Belgium
Democratic Republic of the Congo expatriate sportspeople in Belgium
Expatriate footballers in France
Democratic Republic of the Congo expatriate sportspeople in France
21st-century Democratic Republic of the Congo people